Oran Kenneth Gragson (February 14, 1911 – October 7, 2002) was an American businessman and politician. He was the longest-serving mayor of Las Vegas, Nevada, from 1959 to 1975. Gragson, a member of the Republican Party, was a small business owner who was elected Mayor on a reform platform against police corruption and for equal opportunity for people of all socio-economic and racial categories. He is, as of 2022, the most recent Republican mayor of the city.

After he became the mayor of Las Vegas, Gragson also became an integral part of the construction of the US 95 freeway. Gragson was at a Las Vegas church when he collapsed with a heart attack, and later died in a Las Vegas hospital on October 7, 2002, at the age of 91. The US 95 was named in his memory, and he was buried in a Las Vegas cemetery.

Gragson's grandson Scott became a real estate developer for the city, and his great-grandson Noah Gragson is currently a NASCAR driver competing in the NASCAR Cup Series.

See also
 List of mayors of Las Vegas

References

External links
 

1911 births
2002 deaths
Mayors of Las Vegas
Nevada Republicans
People from the Las Vegas Valley
People from Tucumcari, New Mexico
20th-century American politicians